Nandu Chandravarkar (born 5 August 1949) is an Indian former cricketer. He played three first-class matches for Bengal in 1974/75.

See also
 List of Bengal cricketers

References

External links
 

1949 births
Living people
Indian cricketers
Bengal cricketers
Cricketers from Kolkata